The 2019 Mountain West Conference women's soccer tournament was the postseason women's soccer tournament for the Mountain West Conference held from November through November 9, 2019. The five-match tournament took place at Boas Tennis/Soccer Complex in Boise, Idaho. The six-team single-elimination tournament consisted of three rounds based on seeding from regular season conference play. The San Jose State Spartans were the defending champions, but were unable to defend their title, losing to the New Mexico Lobos 1–0 in the first round. The San Jose State Spartans won the tournament with a 2–0 win over San Diego St in the final.  This was the first tournament championship for Boise State, and the first for coach Jim Thomas.  Boise State was the regular season champions two years in a row, but 2019 was the first time they converted that into a tournament title.

Bracket

Source:

Schedule

Quarterfinals

Semifinals

Final

Statistics

Goalscorers
4 Goals
 Raimee Sherle (Boise State)

2 Goals
 Melissa Ellis (Fresno State)
 Gabby Gillespie (Boise State)

1 Goal
 Leilani Baker (New Mexico)
 Aubree Chatterton (Boise State)
 Rachel Elve (San Diego State)
 McKenna Kynett (Boise State)
 Taylor Moorehead (San Diego State)
 Kiera Utush (San Diego State)

All-Tournament team

Source:

MVP in bold

References

Mountain West Conference Women's Soccer Tournament
2019 Mountain West Conference women's soccer season